Durbin is an unincorporated community in Clark County, in the U.S. state of Ohio.

History
Durbin had its start when the railroad was extended to that point. The community was named for General Durbin Ward, a railroad official.

References

Unincorporated communities in Clark County, Ohio
Unincorporated communities in Ohio